The Gleaner is daily newspaper published in Jamaica, with a Sunday edition named Sunday Gleaner.

The Gleaner may also refer to:

Newspapers
 Gleaner Company in Jamaica, publishers of the newspapers The Gleaner and Sunday Gleaner
 The Daily Gleaner, a newspaper published in the Canadian province of New Brunswick
 The Henderson Gleaner, a newspaper in the U.S. state of Kentucky
 The Gleaner (Quebec), an English-language newspaper in the Canadian province of Quebec
 The Gleaner, a campus newspaper at Rutgers University-Camden in New Jersey
 The Gleaner, a campus newspaper at Canada's Langara College

Other
 The Gleaner (Murray), a book of essays by American feminist Judith Sargent Murray
 The Gleaners, an oil painting by Jean-François Millet composed in 1857